Florin Mergea and Horia Tecău were the defending champions. Tecău didn't start this year.
Mergea partnered up with Adrian Cruciat. They reached the final, where they lost to Adrián García and David Marrero.

Seeds

Draw

Draw

References

 Doubles Draw

2009 ATP Challenger Tour